Bald Mountain is a high and prominent mountain summit in the Front Range of the Rocky Mountains of North America.

It may be reached by a technically-undemanding though long and roundabout route from Breckenridge, initially through forest and then open country; though as for all mountains of this elevation, altitude sickness is a potential danger as well as afternoon thunderstorms.

Extensive views of the surrounding area may be enjoyed from the summit on a clear day.

Mountain

See also

List of mountain peaks of North America
List of mountain peaks of the United States
List of mountain peaks of Colorado

References

External links

Bald Mountain on 13ers.com
Bald Mountain on listsofjohn.com
Bald Mountain on peakery.com
Bald Mountain on summitpost.org

Bald
Mountains of Summit County, Colorado
Arapaho National Forest
North American 4000 m summits